Mount Band is a mountain on the Scott Coast of Victoria Land. Its name stems from the profusion of colored lichens appearing in bands on brown rocks in the mountains of Victoria Land in Antarctica.

References

Mountains of Victoria Land
Scott Coast